Fernando Trío Zabala (8 July 1939 – 20 February 2016), known as Nando Yosu, was a Spanish football midfielder and manager.

His extensive career, as both a player and coach, was mainly associated to Racing de Santander.

Playing career
Born in Mungia, Basque Country, Yosu played professionally during roughly one decade, appearing in 122 matches in La Liga where he represented Racing de Santander, Valencia CF, Athletic Bilbao and Pontevedra CF, retiring in 1972 at only 31 after spells with CF Calvo Sotelo in the Segunda División and Gimnástica de Torrelavega of the Tercera División.

Early in his career, Yosu was also loaned by Racing to Deportivo Rayo Cantabria, at the time acting as a feeder team. Whilst with the Che he was used rarely in the league – also being loaned to Santander – but scored twice against FC Barcelona in the 1961–62 Inter-Cities Fairs Cup final, a 6–2 home win (7–3 on aggregate).

Managerial career
Immediately after retiring, Yosu began coaching at his last team Gimnástica, even though he did not possess the obligatory licence. Afterwards he returned to main club Racing, starting with its youth teams.

From 1977 to 1979, Yosu served as head manager for Santander, but would work with the club in several other capacities, from match delegate to director of football. Additionally, in no fewer than five occasions, as an interim manager in the 90's/2000's, he successfully led the side away from relegation zone, always in the top level.

In March 2007, Yosu was honoured by the Government of Cantabria for his contribution to football in the area. He retired from the football world for good in January 2009, after leaving his post as Racing's director of football.

Death
Yosu died in Santander on 20 February 2016 at the age of 76, from the effects of Alzheimer's disease.

Honours

Player
 Inter-Cities Fairs Cup: 1961–62, 1962–63

References

External links
 
 
 

1939 births
2016 deaths
People from Mungialdea
Sportspeople from Biscay
Spanish footballers
Footballers from the Basque Country (autonomous community)
Association football midfielders
La Liga players
Segunda División players
Racing de Santander players
Rayo Cantabria players
Valencia CF players
Athletic Bilbao footballers
Pontevedra CF footballers
CD Puertollano footballers
Gimnástica de Torrelavega footballers
Spanish football managers
La Liga managers
Segunda División managers
Gimnástica de Torrelavega managers
Racing de Santander managers
Real Oviedo managers
Granada CF managers
Deportivo Alavés managers
Orihuela Deportiva CF managers
SD Ponferradina managers